The Abebe Bikila Award is an annual prize given by the New York Road Runners club (NYRR) to honour individuals who have made a significant contribution to the sport of long-distance running. The first recipient of the award was Ted Corbitt, a founder of both NYRR and the Road Runners Club of America, who received the honour on October 27, 1978. The award is named in honour of the two-time Olympic marathon winner Abebe Bikila of Ethiopia.

Past winners of the award include: Olympic gold medallists Frank Shorter, Rosa Mota and Lasse Virén; world record breakers Paula Radcliffe, Khalid Khannouchi and Paul Tergat; and multiple major marathon winners Grete Waitz, Alberto Salazar and Joan Samuelson.

While the award has typically been associated with elite level runners, particularly marathon runners, it has also been given to non-athletes. Fred Lebow – creator of the New York Marathon – became the first person to win the award who was not a professional athlete in 1995. The 2001 award was given to Mayor of New York Rudy Giuliani on the basis of his dedication to the city in the aftermath of the September 11 attacks. The 2009 winner, long-time road running organiser and event director Allan Steinfeld, was the third non-professional athlete to receive the award. The Rudin family, long-time sponsors of the New York Marathon, were the first non-individual recipients of the award in 2012.

The award is closely linked with NYRR's annual International Friendship Run, a four-mile fun run from United Nations Plaza to Central Park, which is held immediately following the official award presentation event.

Recipients

References

External links

Sport of athletics awards
American sports trophies and awards
Awards established in 1978
Road running in the United States
1978 establishments in New York City